Breda railway station is a railway station in Breda in North Brabant, Netherlands. It is situated on the Breda–Rotterdam railway, the Roosendaal–Breda railway and the Breda–Eindhoven railway.

History
The first station was opened on 1 May 1855 as the eastern terminus of the Roosendaal–Breda railway. When the line was extended to Tilburg, a new station was built on the same site in 1863. The station was initially run solely by a Belgian company, the Société Anonyme des chemins de fer d'Anvers à Rotterdam until the opening of the line to Tilburg from Staatsspoorwegen (Dutch State Railways), which changed after the merger between that company with the HSM in 1938 to Nederlandse Spoorwegen. In the 1970s, the station was rebuilt in combination with being placed on a viaduct. This station was opened on 10 October 1975 and designed by architect Hans (J.) Bak. The station was recognisable by its design with a large canopy over the two platforms with four tracks. The regional bus station next to the station had the same canopy type.

From 4 April 2011 the high-speed train Fyra from Amsterdam Centraal stops in Breda. This service was renamed in December 2013 to Intercity Direct because of the earlier problems with the V250 rolling stock.

On 30 May 2012 the Minister of Infrastructure Melanie Schultz van Haegen officially launched the project Via Breda, which includes another total reconstruction of the station. On 6 September 2014 at 05:30 (AM), a new pedestrian tunnel was opened alongside the northern part of the station building. The old southern station building will be demolished, as well as the regional and city bus stations. The buses were replaced to the northern side on new elevated bus platforms when the old southern part of the station was closed in the night of 6-7 September after the last night train departed. The project is expected to be completed in 2016, when the southern part of the new station will be opened.

Destinations
The following major destinations are directly connected from Breda railway station:

Dordrecht, Rotterdam Centraal, Delft, Den Haag HS, Den Haag Centraal, Utrecht, Amsterdam, Schiphol, Tilburg, 's-Hertogenbosch, Oss, Nijmegen, Arnhem, Deventer, Zwolle, Eindhoven, Helmond, Venlo and Roosendaal.

Train services
The following services start at Breda:
2× per hour high speed services (Intercity Direct) Amsterdam – Schiphol – Rotterdam – Breda
2× per hour intercity services The Hague – Rotterdam – Breda – Tilburg – Eindhoven (Suspended on section Breda-Eindhoven until April 2017 due to a shortage of trains that are allowed on the HSL-Zuid, which is used between Rotterdam and Breda by this service)
1× per hour intercity service Dordrecht – Breda (Not on evenings and weekends)
2× per hour intercity services Zwolle – Deventer – Zutphen – Arnhem – Nijmegen – 's-Hertogenbosch – Tilburg – Breda – Roosendaal
2× per hour intercity services Breda – Tilburg – Eindhoven (Temporarily replacement services for intercity services between The Hague and Eindhoven which are suspended between Breda and Eindhoven until April 2017)
1× per hour night train (nachtnet) service Rotterdam – Breda – Eindhoven (weekends only)
2× per hour local services (sprinter) Dordrecht – Breda – Tilburg – 's-Hertogenbosch

In the new 2015 railway timetable, which will be implemented on 14 December 2014, the off-peak frequency of the sprinter between Breda and The Hague will be increased to 2× per hour, creating a 2× per hour service on weekdays until 20:00 (8pm).

Bus services

The station is served by city bus services (stadsbussen) as well as several regional bus services (streekbussen)

Stadsbussen

There are 9 city bus lines. All lines are operated by Arriva. From the railway station the city bus lines provides services to/from:

 Centrum (downtown area)
 Amphia Ziekenhuis Langendijk (Hospital)
 Amphia Ziekenhuis Molengracht (Hospital)
 Rat Verlegh Stadion (Stadium of soccer team NAC)
 Prinsenbeek railway station
 The neighbourhoods Brabantpark, Belcrum, Blauwe Kei, Boeimeer, Ginneken, Haagse Beemden, Heusdenhout, Heuvel, Hoge Vucht, Ijpelaar, Nieuw Wolfslaar, Princenhage, Sportpark, Tuinzigt, Westerpark and Zandberg
 The industrial area Krogten
 The neighbouring town of Bavel

Several neighbourhoods are also served by regional bus services (see also: Streekbussen)

The routes of the city buses are as follows:

Streekbussen
Several regional bus lines serve the station. Two of them are also international services to the Dutch town of Hulst via Antwerp in Belgium. (Line 19) and to the village of Meersel-Dreef, also in Belgium. (Line 145) The regional bus lines are operated by Arriva and Connexxion

The routes of the regional buses, serving Breda, Centraal Station are as follows:

References

External links

NS website 
Dutch Public Transport journey planner 

Railway stations in Breda
Railway stations opened in 1855
Railway stations on the Staatslijn E
Railway stations on the Staatslijn I
1855 establishments in the Netherlands
Railway stations in the Netherlands opened in the 19th century